The Samoa national futsal team is controlled by Football Federation Samoa, the governing body for futsal in Samoa and represents the country in international futsal competitions, such as the World Cup and the Oceanian Futsal Championship.

Tournament records

FIFA Futsal World Cup

Oceanian Futsal Championship

References

Oceanian national futsal teams
F